Hongshan may refer to:

Places in China

Districts
Hongshan District, Chifeng in Chifeng, Inner Mongolia
Hongshan District, Wuhan in Wuhan, Hubei

Subdistricts
 Hongshan Subdistrict, Changsha, in Kaifu District, Changsha, Hunan
 Hongshan Subdistrict, Wuhan, a subdistrict in Hongshan District, Hubei
 Hongshan Subdistrict, a subdistrict of Wuxi New Area, Wuxi, Jiangsu
 Hongshan Subdistrict, a subdistrict of Xuanwu District, Jiangsu

Townships
 Hongshan Township, Changting County, a township of Fujian
 Hongshan Township, Luojiang District, a township of Fujian
 Hongshan Township, Yongding County, a township of Fujian

Towns and villages
Hongshan, Jinzhong in Pingyao County, Jinzhong, Shanxi
Hongshan, Shishi (鸿山镇), a town in Shishi, Fujian
Hongshan, Wanquan, a village in Wanquan, Hubei
Hongshan, Yingshan County, a town in Yingshan County, Huanggang, Hubei

Written as "洪山镇"
Hongshan, Anhui in Taihe County, Fuyang
Hongshan, Fuzhou, Fujian, a town in Gulou District, Fujian
Hongshan, Sui County, in Sui County, Hubei
Hongshan, Hengnan, in Hengnan County, Hunan
Hongshan, Shandong, a town in Zichuan District, Zibo
Hongshan, Suizhou, a town in Sui County, Hubei
Hongshan, Jiexiu, a town in Jiexiu, Shanxi

Other
Hongshan culture, Neolithic culture in northeastern China
Hong Shan, a mountain in Ürümqi
Hongshan station (disambiguation), Shenzhen metro

See also
 Zhongshan (disambiguation)